Elections to Cheshire East Council happened on Thursday 5 May 2011. Elections occurred in all 52 wards, with each ward returning between one and three councillors to the council.

The wards were all new, having been created in a boundary review which took effect in January 2011. They replaced the previous 27 three-seat wards used in the 2008 election, which were identical to the former Cheshire County Council wards.

Overall results
The Conservative Party retained overall control of the council, winning 52 out of 82 seats, with a majority of 36 councillors.

After the election, the composition of the council was:

Conservative 52
Labour 16
 Others 10
Liberal Democrat 4

Ward results
An asterisk (*) denotes an incumbent councillor.

Alderley Edge

Councillor Keegan previously served as a member for the now dissolved Alderley ward.

Alsager

Audlem

Councillor Bailey previously served as a member for the now dissolved Cholmondeley ward.

Bollington

Councillor Livesley previously served as a councillor for the now dissolved Prestbury and Tytherington ward.

Brereton Rural

The one seat for this ward was uncontested and the Conservative Party candidate, John Valentine Frank Wray, was elected unopposed.

References

2011 English local elections
2011
2010s in Cheshire